Dávid Kleiber (born 19 January 1990 in Miskolc) is a Hungarian football player who currently plays for Budapest Honvéd FC.He was the best young player in 2007.

External links
 Profile

1990 births
Living people
Sportspeople from Miskolc
Hungarian footballers
Association football forwards
Diósgyőri VTK players
Budapest Honvéd FC players